The 2010–11 All-Ireland Intermediate Club Hurling Championship was the seventh staging of the All-Ireland Intermediate Club Hurling Championship since its establishment by the Gaelic Athletic Association in 2004.

The All-Ireland final was played on 13 February 2011 at Croke Park in Dublin, between Ballymartle from Cork and Dicksboro from Kilkenny. Ballymartle won the match by 3-15 to 1-20 to claim their first ever All-Ireland title.

Results

Leinster Intermediate Club Hurling Championship

Final

Munster Intermediate Club Hurling Championship

Quarter-finals

Semi-finals

Final

All-Ireland Intermediate Club Hurling Championship

Final

References

All-Ireland Intermediate Club Hurling Championship
All-Ireland Intermediate Club Hurling Championship
All-Ireland Intermediate Club Hurling Championship